Ceramide glucosyltransferase (or glucosylceramide synthase) is a glucosyltransferase enzyme involved in the production of glucocerebroside.

It is classified under .

It is inhibited by miglustat and eliglustat, both drugs developed for the treatment of Gaucher disease.

See also 
 Glucocerebroside

References

External links 
 

Transferases